Erick Johnson may refer to:
 Erick H. Johnson, member of the Wisconsin State Assembly 
 Erick Johnson (artist), American artist

See also
 Eric Johnson (disambiguation)